The 1989 Tennessee Volunteers football team represented the University of Tennessee in the 1989 NCAA Division I-A football season. Playing as a member of the Southeastern Conference (SEC), the team was led by head coach Johnny Majors, in his 13th year, and played their home games at Neyland Stadium in Knoxville, Tennessee. They finished the season with a record of eleven wins and one loss (11–1 overall, 6–1 in the SEC), as SEC co-champion, and with a victory over Arkansas in the Cotton Bowl Classic. The Volunteers offense scored 346 points while the defense allowed 217 points.

Schedule

Reference:

Team players drafted into the NFL

Reference:

References

Tennessee
Tennessee Volunteers football seasons
Southeastern Conference football champion seasons
Cotton Bowl Classic champion seasons
Tennessee Volunteers football